The West Virginia Convention of Southern Baptist (WVCSB) is a group of churches affiliated with the Southern Baptist Convention located in the U.S. state of West Virginia. Headquartered in Scott Depot, West Virginia, the convention is made up of 10 Baptist associations and around 210 churches as of 2010.

Affiliated organizations
West Virginia Baptist Foundation
The West Virginia Southern Baptist - the state newspaper

References

External links
West Virginia Convention of Southern Baptist

 

Baptist Christianity in West Virginia
Conventions associated with the Southern Baptist Convention